The North Fork Clearwater River is a major tributary of the Clearwater River in the U.S. state of Idaho.
From its headwaters in the Bitterroot Mountains of eastern Idaho, it flows  westward and is dammed by the Dworshak Dam just above its mouth in north-central Idaho.
The river drains parts of Clearwater, Shoshone, Latah, and Idaho counties. Most of the watershed is managed by the U.S. Forest Service. Some of the fish of the river include westslope cutthroat trout, rainbow trout, mountain whitefish, and the threatened bull trout. It also has smallmouth bass and a kokanee salmon run, both from Dworshak Reservoir.  The North Fork drainage is home to grizzly bears, cougars, deer, moose, black bear, elk, grey wolves, and osprey.  The river used to have a large steelhead run before the implementation of Dworshak Dam.  The North Fork of the Clearwater is located within the Clearwater National Forest

Course
It rises in the Bitterroot Mountains, which form the far eastern border of the State of Idaho, on the Idaho-Montana border. The headwaters are on the south flank of the triple summits of Graves Peak, Illinois Peak and Gold Crown Peak, very near St. Joe Lake, the head waters of the St. Joe River, which flows into Coeur d'Alene Lake. The river immediately flows southwest through a narrow gorge, joined by numerous small tributaries. The river turns southeast to join with Long Creek and Lake Creek, which flow in from the east. After joining these two large creeks, the river turns west, then receives Elizabeth Creek from the right as it veers to the south. Then it turns sharply west into a wider valley, where it receives its largest tributary thus far,  Kelly Creek, from the left near an unincorporated community, and turns west and southwest, paralleled by Forest Service Road #250. It then receives 4 July Creek from the left, Weitas Creek from the left, Orogrande Creek from the left and Quartz Creek from the right.

Flowing northeast then swinging back west, the river receives Skull Creek from the northeast just downstream of the Quartz Creek confluence. Beaver Creek enters from the south and Isabella Creek from the north. With high buttes towering to the north and comparatively gradual mountains rising on the south, the river enters Dworshak Reservoir, formed by the massive Dworshak Dam. About  later, the flooded canyon meets the canyon of the Little North Fork Clearwater River on the right, which is also flooded for some distance. Still narrow and winding, following the river's original course, the reservoir branches to the south and spreads wider as it enters more gradual terrain. Reeds Creek and Elk Creek, formerly major tributaries of the river, now flow directly into the lake. Below the dam the river runs southeast for a little over a mile, crosses under Idaho State Route 7, and meets the Clearwater River at Ahsahka.

Watershed
The watershed is approximately 26.6 percent of the  Clearwater River watershed, itself a tributary of the Snake River. The drainage area of the St. Joe River abuts the North Fork drainage to the north, Latah Creek to the northeast, the Middle Fork Clearwater to the east and south, the South Fork Clearwater and Snake River to the south, and the Potlatch River and Clearwater to the west. The basin is very lightly populated - the largest and only incorporated town is Elk River, Idaho, population 149. The logging industry makes up the primary economy of the North Fork's watershed.

The major tributaries to the North Fork Clearwater River are (proceeding downstream) Kelly Creek, the Little North Fork Clearwater River, and Elk Creek.

The USGS operated a stream gauge near the mouth of the river from 1927 to 1968.

See also

List of Idaho rivers
List of longest streams of Idaho

References

Works cited
Benke, Arthur C.; Cushing, Colbert E. (2005). Rivers of North America. Academic Press. .
Robbins, Chuck (2003). On the Fly Guide to the Northern Rockies. Wilderness Adventures Press. .

Rivers of Idaho
Tributaries of the Snake River
Rivers of Shoshone County, Idaho
Rivers of Clearwater County, Idaho
Rivers of Latah County, Idaho
Rivers of Idaho County, Idaho
Clearwater National Forest